The 2016 Toronto Argonauts season was the 59th season for the team in the Canadian Football League and their 144th season overall. The Argonauts finished in 4th place in the East Division with a 5–13 record and missed the playoffs for the second time in three years. It also marks the 2nd straight year the Grey Cup hosts have failed to make the playoffs after the Winnipeg Blue Bombers last season.

After the Hamilton Tiger-Cats defeated the Ottawa Redblacks in overtime in week 18 on October 21, 2016, the Argonauts were eliminated from the playoffs while they were playing in the second quarter against the Calgary Stampeders. This was the team's fifth season under head coach Scott Milanovich, and the sixth under general manager Jim Barker. It was announced in January 2017 that Jim Barker would be relieved of his duties as general manager after a disappointing 2016 CFL season which saw the Argonauts win a league low 5 games that season, tied with the Saskatchewan Roughriders for league worst that season. Shortly after Jim Barker's termination, Scott Milanovich resigned from his duties as the Argonauts' head coach to work as an assistant coach with the Jacksonville Jaguars.

This was the first season for the Argonauts at their new home stadium, BMO Field, as renovations now allow Canadian football to be played there. The team had averaged 16,380 in fan attendance and had a season high 24,812 fans attend the home opener. The club also had a new ownership group, with Larry Tanenbaum and Bell Canada officially taking ownership on January 1, 2016.

Offseason

CFL draft 
The 2016 CFL Draft took place on May 10, 2016. The Argonauts had nine selections in the eight-round draft after trading Bruce Campbell for another fourth-round pick.

Preseason 

 Games played with colour uniforms.

Regular season

Standings

Schedule 

 Games played with colour uniforms.
 Games played with white uniforms.

Team 
The team was led at quarterback by Ricky Ray, who had three statistically brilliant seasons between 2012 and 2014, earning eastern Most Outstanding Player nominations in the latter two years. Ray battled injuries in each of his five seasons as an Argonaut and has not played an entire 18 game season since his last season in Edmonton. Following the departure of Trevor Harris to the Ottawa RedBlacks in early 2016, the backup QB situation was a bit of a revolving door; with Logan Kilgore, Dan LeFevour, Cody Fajardo, and Drew Willy all taking snaps under centre.

The receiving corps remained largely unchanged from the previous season with Tori Gurley, Kevin Elliott, and Vidal Hazelton (The Big Three) returning after posting productive seasons in 2015, also returning to the receiving group were Diontae Spencer and Kenny Shaw. On October 3, 2016, the team announced they had released Gurley, Elliott, and Hazelton, along with Phil Bates. The move was considered a shock by most, but post-game comments by Scott Milanovich in Montreal on October 2, 2016 following a loss to the Als revealed the move which was about to take place was about more than just on-field issues.  "We've got some good football players here that I'm not sure are real committed to what we need to have take place, and it's little things; being late, not showing up prepared, screwing around and that's where we're at right now, it's not going to stay that way."

Running back Brandon Whitaker was leaned on heavily and was having a productive season. He finished second in the league in rushing yards with 1009 on 186 carries, which was his second career 1000-yard rushing season, earning him a third consecutive Eastern All-Star award.

On the defensive side of the ball, following last season's departure of star defensive linemen Cleyon Laing and Tristan Okpalaugo to the NFL's Miami Dolphins and Arizona Cardinals respectively, the Argos were able to secure the services of Justin Hickman and Bryan Hall from the Hamilton Tiger-Cats, as well as trade OL Matt Sewell and QB Mitchell Gale to the Saskatchewan Roughriders for DE Shawn Lemon and a conditional 2018 draft pick. Lemon seemed to fit into Defensive Coordinator Rich Stubler's system well, as he finished with 14 sacks (career high) in 16 games and earned his first East Division All-Star nomination.

Roster

Coaching staff

References

Toronto Argonauts seasons
2016 Canadian Football League season by team
Toronto Argonauts